The 1948–49 Sheffield Shield season was the 47th season of the Sheffield Shield, the domestic first-class cricket competition of Australia. New South Wales won the championship. In March 1949, Donald Bradman played his final first-class match.

Table

Statistics

Most Runs
Arthur Morris 858

Most Wickets
Geff Noblet & Alan Walker 38

References

Sheffield Shield
Sheffield Shield
Sheffield Shield seasons